The Batam-Bintan Bridge, also known as the Babin Bridge (from Batam and Bintan) is a proposed series of cable-stayed bridges crossing the Riau Strait between the islands of Batam and Bintan in the Riau Islands of Indonesia, near Singapore. Construction is scheduled to start in 2022 at a cost of 13.66 trillion rupiah (US$938 million), which was planned to be provided under a joint government-enterprises financing scheme. It was targeted to be finished at 2024.

Totaling , the construction of the bridge will involve three separate sections spanning four islands: from Batam to Tanjung Sauh, from Tanjung Sauh to Buau and from Buau to Bintan. If built, it will become the longest bridge in Indonesia. The total length of the toll road will be .

References

Buildings and structures in the Riau Islands
Cable-stayed bridges in Indonesia
Concrete bridges
Proposed bridges in Indonesia
Road bridges
Toll bridges in Indonesia